The 1946 Bulgarian Cup Final was the 6th final of the Bulgarian Cup (in this period the tournament was named Cup of the Soviet Army), and was contested between Levski Sofia and Chernolomets Popovo on 6 May 1946 at Yunak Stadium in Sofia. Levski won the final 4–1.

Route to the Final

Match

Details

See also
1946 Bulgarian Republic Football Championship

References

Bulgarian Cup finals
PFC Levski Sofia matches
Cup Final